Marcus Hook Roll Band were an Australian rock group formed by Harry Vanda and George Young. The group is noted for featuring Malcolm and Angus Young prior to forming AC/DC.

Overview
Marcus Hook Roll Band featured George Young (vocals, guitar, piano, bass), Harry Vanda (lead guitar, vocals), Alex Young (saxophone), Angus Young (guitar), Malcolm Young (guitar), Freddie Smith (drums), Ian Campbell (bass), John Proud (drums), and Howard Casey (saxophone). The project released one record, Tales of Old Grand Daddy (1973), which was issued only in Australia (EMI), although a variation would later be released in the U.S. on Capitol's "green label" budget series (#SN-11991) in the wake of Vanda and Young's Flash And The Pan album. They also released three singles, the first being "Natural Man"/"Boogalooing Is For Wooing", followed by "Louisiana Lady"/"Hoochie Coochie Har Kau (Lee Ho's Blues)", and "Can't Stand the Heat"/"Moonshine Blues".

Discography

Studio albums

Singles

Notes

References

Australian rock music groups